"Little Miss Honky Tonk" is a song written by Ronnie Dunn, and recorded by American country music duo Brooks & Dunn.  It was released in February 1995 as the third single from their album Waitin' on Sundown. The song reached the top of the Billboard Hot Country Singles & Tracks chart.

Critical reception
Deborah Evans Price, of Billboard magazine reviewed the song favorably, calling it "an ode to a barroom queen." She goes on to say that it is a nice taste of the duo's rockier side and the first use of the phrase "buckle bunny" in a country song.

Music video 
The music video was directed by Sherman Halsey and premiered in early 1995. It features the duo as observers as a female mechanic sets out to be crowned "little miss honky tonk". Kix Brooks magically changes her car from a rusty station wagon to a sleek black chevy pickup and her clothes from dusty old rags to a polka dot dress using his guitar. At the event, she impresses the judges and wins the contest, and is escorted out by the whole bar in the end.

Chart positions
"Little Miss Honky Tonk" debuted at number 70 on the U.S. Billboard Hot Country Singles & Tracks for the week of February 18, 1995.

Year-end charts

References

1995 singles
1994 songs
Brooks & Dunn songs
Songs written by Ronnie Dunn
Song recordings produced by Scott Hendricks
Song recordings produced by Don Cook
Music videos directed by Sherman Halsey
Arista Nashville singles